Joppich is a surname. Notable people with the surname include: 
 Alexander Joppich (born 1995), Austrian footballer
 Karl Joppich (1908–1940), German footballer
 Peter Joppich (born 1982), German foil fencer
German-language surnames

Surnames of German origin
Surnames of Austrian origin